The 1972–73 New York Knicks season was the 27th season of NBA basketball in New York City. The Knicks captured their second NBA title as they defeated the Los Angeles Lakers in the NBA Finals, four games to one, which was exactly the same count the Knicks lost to the Lakers a year earlier. To date this is the last Knicks' championship. This is also the Knicks' last season with a Finals appearance until 1993–94, 21 years later.

Besides being the last Knicks team to win a championship, the team is also remembered for the deep roster of future Hall of Fame players, which included Dave DeBusschere, Walt "Clyde" Frazier, Jerry Lucas, Earl "The Pearl" Monroe, Willis Reed, Future U.S. Senator Bill Bradley, and future Hall of Fame coach Phil Jackson.

Draft picks

Note: This is not an extensive list; it only covers the first and second rounds, and any other players picked by the franchise that played at least one game in the league.

Roster

Pre season

Game log

|-

All times are EASTERN time

Regular season

Standings

z – clinched division title
y – clinched division title
x – clinched playoff spot

Record vs. opponents

Game log

Playoffs

|- align="center" bgcolor="#ccffcc"
| 1
| March 30
| Baltimore
| W 95–83
| Walt Frazier (25)
| Frazier, DeBusschere (7)
| Walt Frazier (6)
| Madison Square Garden19,694
| 1–0
|- align="center" bgcolor="#ccffcc"
| 2
| April 1
| Baltimore
| W 123–103
| Walt Frazier (29)
| Dave DeBusschere (11)
| Walt Frazier (13)
| Madison Square Garden19,694
| 2–0
|- align="center" bgcolor="#ccffcc"
| 3
| April 4
| @ Baltimore
| W 103–96
| Bill Bradley (23)
| Dave DeBusschere (11)
| Walt Frazier (7)
| Baltimore Civic Center12,289
| 3–0
|- align="center" bgcolor="#ffcccc"
| 4
| April 6
| @ Baltimore
| L 89–97
| Walt Frazier (17)
| Willis Reed (8)
| DeBusschere, Monroe (4)
| Baltimore Civic Center12,289
| 3–1
|- align="center" bgcolor="#ccffcc"
| 5
| April 8
| Baltimore
| W 109–99
| Earl Monroe (26)
| Dave DeBusschere (15)
| Walt Frazier (7)
| Madison Square Garden19,694
| 4–1
|-

|- align="center" bgcolor="#ffcccc"
| 1
| April 15
| @ Boston
| L 108–134
| Walt Frazier (24)
| Walt Frazier (7)
| Walt Frazier (10)
| Boston Garden15,320
| 0–1
|- align="center" bgcolor="#ccffcc"
| 2
| April 18
| Boston
| W 129–96
| Walt Frazier (24)
| Dave DeBusschere (8)
| Walt Frazier (10)
| Madison Square Garden19,694
| 1–1
|- align="center" bgcolor="#ccffcc"
| 3
| April 20
| @ Boston
| W 98–91
| Walt Frazier (23)
| DeBusschere, Reed (11)
| Walt Frazier (5)
| Boston Garden15,320
| 2–1
|- align="center" bgcolor="#ccffcc"
| 4
| April 22
| Boston
| W 117–110 (2OT)
| Walt Frazier (37)
| Dave DeBusschere (10)
| Dean Meminger (7)
| Madison Square Garden19,694
| 3–1
|- align="center" bgcolor="#ffcccc"
| 5
| April 25
| @ Boston
| L 97–98
| Walt Frazier (21)
| Dave DeBusschere (12)
| Frazier, DeBusschere (5)
| Boston Garden15,320
| 3–2
|- align="center" bgcolor="#ffcccc"
| 6
| April 27
| Boston
| L 100–110
| Walt Frazier (29)
| Dave DeBusschere (17)
| Bradley, DeBusschere (5)
| Madison Square Garden19,694
| 3–3
|- align="center" bgcolor="#ccffcc"
| 7
| April 29
| @ Boston
| W 94–78
| Walt Frazier (25)
| Walt Frazier (10)
| Dave DeBusschere (8)
| Boston Garden15,320
| 4–3
|-

|- align="center" bgcolor="#ffcccc"
| 1
| May 1
| @ Los Angeles
| L 112–115
| Dave DeBusschere (25)
| Dave DeBusschere (16)
| Walt Frazier (8)
| The Forum17,505
| 0–1
|- align="center" bgcolor="#ccffcc"
| 2
| May 3
| @ Los Angeles
| W 99–95
| Bill Bradley (26)
| DeBusschere, Reed (9)
| Bill Bradley (4)
| The Forum17,505
| 1–1
|- align="center" bgcolor="#ccffcc"
| 3
| May 6
| Los Angeles
| W 87–83
| Willis Reed (22)
| Dave DeBusschere (11)
| Earl Monroe (6)
| Madison Square Garden19,694
| 2–1
|- align="center" bgcolor="#ccffcc"
| 4
| May 8
| Los Angeles
| W 103–98
| Dave DeBusschere (33)
| Dave DeBusschere (14)
| Walt Frazier (8)
| Madison Square Garden19,694
| 3–1
|- align="center" bgcolor="#ccffcc"
| 5
| May 10
| @ Los Angeles
| W 102–93
| Earl Monroe (23)
| Willis Reed (12)
| Frazier, Bradley (5)
| The Forum17,505
| 4–1
|-

Player statistics

Season

|- align="center"
|  || 51 || || 10.1 || 1.7 || || 0.3 || 0.8 || 1.0 || || || 3.8
|- align="center"
|  || 55 || || 8.6 || 1.4 || || 1.3 || 1.5 || 1.2 || || || 4.2
|- align="center"
|  || 82 || || 36.6 || 7.0 || || 2.1 || 3.7 || 4.5 || || || 16.1
|- align="center"
|  || 77 || || 36.7 || 6.9 || || 2.5 || 10.2 || 3.4 || || || 16.3
|- align="center"
|  || 78 || || 40.8 || 8.7 || || 3.7 || 7.3 || 5.9 || || || 21.1
|- align="center"
|  || 52 || || 9.9 || 1.5 || || 0.4 || 2.9 || 0.5 || || || 3.5
|- align="center"
|  || 80 || || 17.4 || 3.1 || || 1.9 || 4.3 || 1.2 || || || 8.1
|- align="center"
|  || 71 || || 28.2 || 4.4 || || 1.1 || 7.2 || 4.5 || || || 9.9
|- align="center"
|  || 80 || || 18.2 || 2.4 || || 1.0 || 2.9 || 1.7 || || || 5.7
|- align="center"
|  || 75 || || 31.6 || 6.6 || || 2.3 || 3.3 || 3.8 || || || 15.5
|- align="center"
|  || 1 || || 2.0 || 0.0 || || 0.0 || 1.0 || 0.0 || || || 0.0
|- align="center"
|  || 69 || || 27.2 || 4.8 || || 1.3 || 1.5 || 1.2 || || || 11.0
|- align="center"
|  || 14 || || 4.6 || 0.7 || || 1.1 || 1.1 || 0.1 || || || 2.5
|- align="center"
|  || 13 || || 4.5 || 0.7 || || 0.2 || 1.2 || 0.1 || || || 1.5
|- align="center"
|  || 82 || || 240.6 || 44.2 || || 16.5 || 47.3 || 26.7 || || || 105.0
|}

Opponents

vs. Atlanta

vs. Baltimore

vs. Boston

vs. Buffalo

vs. Chicago

vs. Cleveland

vs. Detroit

vs. Golden State

vs. Houston

vs. Kansas City-Omaha

vs. Los Angeles

vs. Milwaukee

vs. Philadelphia

vs. Phoenix

vs. Portland

vs. Seattle

Playoffs

|- align="center"
|  || 4 || || 4.3 || 0.8 || || 0.0 || 0.0 || 5.5 || || || 1.5
|- align="center"
|  || 6 || || 7.2 || 1.3 || || 0.7 || 0.3 || 0.5 || || || 3.3
|- align="center"
|  || 17 || || 34.5 || 5.8 || || 2.4 || 3.4 || 2.6 || || || 14.0
|- align="center"
|  || 17 || || 37.2 || 6.9 || || 2.3 || 10.5 || 3.4 || || || 15.6
|- align="center"
|  || 17 || || 45.0 || 8.8 || || 4.3 || 7.3 || 6.2 || || || 21.9
|- align="center"
|  || 52 || || 7.9 || 1.6 || || 0.4 || 1.9 || 0.1 || || || 3.6
|- align="center"
|  || 17 || || 19.9 || 3.5 || || 1.6 || 4.2 || 1.4 || || || 8.7
|- align="center"
|  || 17 || || 21.6 || 3.2 || || 1.2 || 5.0 || 2.3 || || || 7.5
|- align="center"
|  || 17 || || 19.0 || 1.8 || || 1.1 || 2.2 || 2.2 || || || 4.8
|- align="center"
|  || 16 || || 31.5 || 6.9 || || 2.3 || 3.2 || 3.2 || || || 16.1
|- align="center"
|  || 17 || || 28.6 || 5.7 || || 1.1 || 7.6 || 1.8 || || || 12.5
|- align="center"
|  || 3 || || 4.0 || 1.7 || || 0.3 || 2.3 || 0.0 || || || 3.7
|- align="center"
|  || 17 || || 48.4 || 48.0 || || 17.2 || 47.9 || 24.2 || || || 113.2
|}

Opponents

1973 NBA Eastern Conference Semifinals vs. Baltimore

1973 NBA Eastern Conference Finals vs. Boston

1973 NBA Finals vs. Los Angeles

Media

Local TV

Some New York Knicks TV Games never aired on WOR-TV because of broadcast conflict with the New York Rangers (NHL).

Local cable TV

Local radio

Some New York Knicks radio games never aired on WNBC–AM because of broadcast conflict with the New York Rangers (NHL).

Awards and records

24th NBA All-Star Game

New York Knicks NBA All-Star representatives at the 1973 NBA All-Star Game in Chicago, Illinois at Chicago Stadium.

Transactions
Transactions listed are from July 1, 1972 to June 30, 1973.

Trades

References
 Knicks on Database Basketball
 Knicks on Basketball Reference

New York
New York Knicks seasons
Eastern Conference (NBA) championship seasons
NBA championship seasons
New York Knicks
New York Knicks
1970s in Manhattan
Madison Square Garden